Kurankoppa is a village in Dharwad district of Karnataka, India.

Demographics 
As of the 2011 Census of India there were 566 households in Kurankoppa and a total population of 3,034 consisting of 1,584 males and 1,450 females. There were 400 children ages 0-6.

References

Villages in Dharwad district